Anicetus is a parasitic wasp genus in the subfamily Encyrtinae.

Species 
 Anicetus abyssinicus Annecke, 1967
 Anicetus africanus (Girault, 1920)
 Anicetus aligarhensis Hayat, Alam & Agarwal, 1975
 Anicetus angustus Hayat, Alam & Agarwal, 1975
 Anicetus anneckei Prinsloo & Mynhardt, 1981
 Anicetus annulatus Timberlake, 1919
 Anicetus aquilus (Annecke, 1967)
 Anicetus argentinus (Fidalgo, 1979)
 Anicetus ashmeadi Hayat, Alam & Agarwal, 1975
 Anicetus austrinus (Annecke, 1967)
 Anicetus beneficus Ishii & Yasumatsu, 1954
 Anicetus calidus (Annecke, 1967)
 Anicetus ceroplastis Ishii, 1928
 Anicetus ceroplastodis (Mani, 1935)
 Anicetus ceylonensis Howard, 1896
 Anicetus chinensis Girault, 1916
 Anicetus clivus (Annecke, 1967)
 Anicetus communis Annecke, 1967
 Anicetus deltoideus Annecke, 1967
 Anicetus dodonia Ferrière, 1935
 Anicetus eous Trjapitzin, 1965
 Anicetus felix (Girault, 1915)
 Anicetus fotsyae Risbec, 1959
 Anicetus fuscus Annecke, 1967
 Anicetus graminosus Annecke, 1967
 Anicetus howardi Hayat, Alam & Agarwal, 1975
 Anicetus inglisiae Hayat, 2003
 Anicetus integrellus Trjapitzin, 1962
 Anicetus italicus (Masi, 1917)
 Anicetus korotyaevi Sugonjaev, 2005
 Anicetus mirabilis (Girault, 1921)
 Anicetus myartsevae Trjapitzin & Ruíz Cancino, 2009
 Anicetus mysterius Sugonjaev, 2005
 Anicetus nyasicus (Compere, 1938)
 Anicetus ohgushii Tachikawa, 1958
 Anicetus parilis (Annecke, 1967)
 Anicetus parvus Compere, 1937
 Anicetus pattersoni (Waterston, 1917)
 Anicetus primus (Howard, 1898)
 Anicetus quintanai De Santis, 1964
 Anicetus rarisetus Xu & He, 1997
 Anicetus rubensi Xu & He, 1997
 Anicetus russeus (Annecke, 1967)
 Anicetus sepis (Annecke, 1967)
 Anicetus stylatus Subba Rao, 1977
 Anicetus taylori (Annecke, 1967)
 Anicetus thanhi Sugonjaev, 2005
 Anicetus thymi Sharkov, 1988
 Anicetus toumeyellae Milliron, 1959
 Anicetus villarreali Trjapitzin & Ruíz Cancino, 2009
 Anicetus zhejiangensis Xu & Li, 1991

See also 
 List of encyrtid genera

References 

 Trjapitzin, V.A. & E.R. Cancino 2009: Especies del género Anicetus Howard (Hymenoptera: Encyrtidae) del Nuevo Mundo. Acta Zoologica Mexicana (n.s.) 25 (2): 249–268

External links 
 

Encyrtinae
Hymenoptera genera